X Country was a Commercial-free Music channel on XM Satellite Radio devoted to progressive country music. It was available on channel 12 on XM Radio and channel 810 on DirecTV.

Artists on the playlist included Robert Earl Keen, Lyle Lovett, John Hiatt, Todd Snider, Lucinda Williams, Steve Earle, Cross Canadian Ragweed, John Prine, Pat Green and Dwight Yoakam, and Jason Isbell.

The channel's name was pronounced "Cross Country." On November 12, 2008, the channel was replaced with Sirius Satellite Radio's Outlaw Country as part of the merger of the two services.

See also
XM Satellite Radio channel history

Defunct radio stations in the United States
Radio stations established in 2001
Radio stations disestablished in 2008